The Vincent Black Lightning was a Vincent-HRD motorcycle first built in September 1948 at the Vincent works in Great North Road, Stevenage, Hertfordshire, UK, and produced from 1948 to 1952. The bike was a purpose-built factory modified Black Shadow that was then named and produced as the Black Lightning. At the time the Black Lightning was the fastest production motorcycle in the world.

Development

Vincent-HRD began motorcycle production in 1928 and were well established after World War II when they launched the  Black Lightning. This was a production version of the Black Lightning which held the motorcycle land-speed record, with a similar engine specification.

Available to order, a standard Black Lightning was supplied in racing trim with magnesium alloy components, special racing tyres on alloy rims, rear-set foot controls, a solo seat and aluminium mudguards. The  air-cooled OHV pushrod V-twin specifications were always based on standard parts but upgraded with higher-performance racing equipment. The Black Lightning had higher-strength connecting rods, larger inlet ports, polished rocker gear, steel idler gears, racing carburettors, and a manual-advance magneto, and was available with compression ratios between 6.8:1 and 12.5:1. Only 31 Black Lightnings were ever built before production ended in 1952 because of Vincent's financial problems.

US record and picture

On 13 September 1948, Rollie Free achieved the US national motorcycle speed record at Bonneville Salt Flats in Utah riding the first Vincent Black Lightning. To reduce drag, Free stripped to his swimming shorts for the final run, which he made lying flat with his legs stretched out and his head low, guiding the Vincent by following a black stripe painted on the salt bed. This led to one of the most famous photographs in motorcycle history, known as the "bathing suit bike". The American Motorcyclist Association certified Free's record. Innovative features of the bike included the first-ever Vincent rear shock absorber, the first Mk II racing cams and horizontally mounted racing carburettors.

Auction record
In February 2018, during an auction held by Bonhams at Las Vegas, a Black Lightning, stated to be one of only 19 surviving, set an absolute world record for the highest-price paid at auction for a motorcycle of $US929,000 ($1.16 million Australian). The machine was used to set a national speed record in Australia during 1953, and was purchased by an undisclosed Australian.

Richard Thompson song
Richard Thompson wrote the song "1952 Vincent Black Lightning" and recorded it for his 1991 album Rumor and Sigh. Thompson later said, "When I was a kid, that was always the exotic bike ... the one that made you go 'ooh, wow'". The song's outlaw hero James, who has "robbed many a man to get my Vincent machine," comments on the bike's mystique in his dying speech: 
Says James: "In my opinion,
there's nothing in this world,
beats a '52 Vincent,
and a red-headed girl.
Now Nortons, and Indians, and Greeveses won't do;
they don't have a soul
like a Vincent '52."

See also
 Vincent Black Shadow
 Vincent Rapide
 List of motorcycles of the 1940s
 List of motorcycles of the 1950s

Notes

Black Lightning
Land speed record motorcycles
Motorcycles introduced in 1948